Omorgus scabrosus is a beetle of the family Trogidae. It is found in the United States and Canada.

References

scabrosus
Insects of Canada
Beetles of the United States
Beetles described in 1818
Taxa named by Palisot de Beauvois